Laminacauda parvipalpis is a species of sheet weaver found in Chile. It was described by Millidge in 1985.

References

Linyphiidae
Endemic fauna of Chile
Spiders of South America
Spiders described in 1985